Prem Kumar is an Indian actor who appears in Tamil films. He rose to fame starring in television serials, and was also the winner of season 1 of the reality dance show Jodi Number One. In the Nadigar Sangam elections held on 18 October 2015, he was elected as an executive committee member. He is the grandson of Shanmugha Rajeswara Sethupathi, the Raja of Ramnad.

Career
Prem made his acting debut starring in a television serial produced by K. Balachander and directed by Samuthirakani called Anni. He was recommended by Dr. M. Karunanidhi, who had seen him perform in the TV serial Annamalai, to feature in the film version of Karunanidhi's novel Kannamma. The film released in 2005 to average reviews.

He participated in season one of Jodi Number One with Pooja, his co-star in Annamalai. He went on to win season 1 and announced a move away from television serials and into films. He has since appeared in films including Nepali (2008), Unnaipol Oruvan (2009) and Vallakottai (2010). His brother-in-law is the singer Harish Raghavendra.

Filmography

Web series

Television
Serials
 Nimmathi Ungal Choice II: Triveni Sangamam (Sun TV)
 Nimmathi Ungal Choice V: Manasatchi (Sun TV)
 2001-2003 Anni as Muthiah Ramanathan (Jaya TV)
 2002 Soolam as Senathipathi (Sun TV)
 2003-2005 Annamalai as Nambi (Sun TV)
 2004-2005 Manaivi as Arivazhagan "Arivu" (Sun TV)

Reality Shows
 2006 Jodi No. 1 as participant and Title Winner along with Pooja (Star Vijay)

References

External links 
 
 

Indian male film actors
Living people
Film people from Tamil Nadu
Male actors in Tamil cinema
Year of birth missing (living people)